Fish emulsion is a fertilizer emulsion that is produced from the fluid remains of fish processed for fish oil and fish meal industrially.

Production
The process of creating fish emulsion begins with whole fish, or with carcass products of fish, such as bones, scales, and skin, which are left after a fish has been processed. The fish and carcass products are then ground into a slurry. After the oils and fish meal are removed from the slurry, the slurry is officially a fish emulsion. Most emulsions are then strained to remove any remaining solids, and sulfuric acid is often added to increase the acidity and prevent the growth of microbes.

Gardening
Since fish emulsion is naturally derived, it is considered an organic fertilizer appropriate for use in organic horticulture. In addition to having a typical N-P-K analysis of 5-2-2, fish emulsion adds micronutrients.

Fish emulsion, applied as a liquid fertilizer, is also used when growing roses to enhance the bloom color of the flowers.

See also

 Fish hydrolysate
 Organic fertilizers

References

Organic fertilizers
Fish products
Soil improvers